Climacodon pulcherrimus is a species of tooth fungus in the family Phanerochaetaceae. It was first described as a species of Hydnum by Miles Berkeley and Moses Ashley Curtis in 1849. T.L. Nikolajeva transferred it to its current genus Climacodon in 1962, but research published in 2007 suggests it should be placed in a different genus. It is widely distributed in subtropical and tropical areas, where it grows on decomposing hardwoods, causing a white rot.

References

Fungi described in 1849
Fungi of North America
Fungal plant pathogens and diseases
Phanerochaetaceae
Taxa named by Miles Joseph Berkeley